The 1938–39 season was the 47th season of competitive league football in the history of English football club Wolverhampton Wanderers. They played in the top tier of the English football system, the Football League First Division. 

The team finished as runners-up for a second consecutive season and also finished as FA Cup runners-up when they lost the 
FA Cup Final to outsiders Portsmouth. This was to be the final full league campaign until 1946–47 as the following season was cancelled and annulled in September 1939 after the outbreak of World War II.

Results

Football League First Division
Final table

Pld = Matches played; W = Matches won; D = Matches drawn; L = Matches lost; F = Goals for; A = Goals against; GA = Goal average; Pts = Points

FA Cup

Players Used

References
General Stats
Results
Team Details

1938–39
Wolverhampton Wanderers F.C.